Southwest Tanna is a dialect chain spoken on the southwestern coast of Tanna Island in Vanuatu. Lynch (1982) names three major dialects: Nivhaal in the north-west of the language area (spelt "Nauvhal" in publicity for the 2015 film Tanna), Nivai in the south-west, and Nelpwaai in the north-east.

References

External links
Database of audio recordings in language of Tanna, Southwest - basic Catholic prayers
Paradisec has two collections of Arthur Cappell's materials (AC1, AC2) that include Southwest Tanna language materials.
Nehrbass's Comprehensive lexicon contains data on the dialects of the Southwest Tanna language 

Languages of Vanuatu
South Vanuatu languages